The Unicameral Youth Legislature, formerly the Unicameral Youth Conference is a four-day legislative simulation in Nebraska, US in which high school students take on the role of lawmakers. Student senators sponsor bills, conduct committee hearings, debate legislation, and discover the unique process of the United States' only unicameral state legislature.

The Unicameral Youth Legislature gives behind-the-scenes access to students who have an interest in public office, government, politics, law, public policy, debate, or public speaking. Students will learn about the inner workings of the Legislature directly from senators, staff, and lobbyists. Bill topics are based on legislation considered during the most recent legislative session. From driving laws to the death penalty, topics selected for the legislature are diverse and engaging.

Legislative activities are conducted at the Nebraska State Capitol Building in the historic Warner Chamber, which was home to the Nebraska Senate until the state consolidated to a one-house legislature in 1937.

The youth legislature is organized by the Nebraska State 4-H Office and the University of Nebraska-Lincoln Extension Office youth development program. The Clerk of the Nebraska Legislature, through the Unicameral Information Office, serves as a technical consultant for the Unicameral Youth Legislature.

Youth model government
Youth organizations based in Nebraska
Nebraska Legislature